Limp wristing is a phenomenon commonly encountered by semi-automatic pistol shooters, where the shooter's grip is not firm enough  the wrist is not held firm/straight enough to keep the frame of the firearm from traveling rearward while the bolt or slide of the pistol cycles. This condition often results in a failure to complete the operating cycle, properly termed a malfunction, but commonly (and incorrectly) termed a "jam". Both semi-automatic rifles and semi-automatic shotguns, if fired without the stock held against the shoulder correctly, may also be prone to limp wristing. Of the important variables involved in this type of malfunction, bullet and gas momentum, slide and barrel mass, recoil spring pre-load and spring rate, and shooting hand and arm mass are much more important than the compliance (limpness) of the wrist.

Overview of the operating cycle
The cycling of any type of semiautomatic firearm can be broken down into two phases; the first is the rearward motion of the bolt or slide (hereafter referred to only as slide, which is the most common form in pistols), the second is the forward motion of the slide.  The rearward motion of the slide is initiated by the force of firing, and continues using the slide's inertia.  While the slide moves rearwards, a spring, called the recoil spring, is compressed, absorbing the energy of the slide while slowing it down. Approximately 50% of the momentum imparted by the bullet and gas is converted into kinetic energy of the slide relative to the frame. This energy is stored by the recoil spring. The other approximate 50% of the momentum is converted to the kinetic energy by accelerating the hand and arm mass.  During this phase the fired cartridge case is extracted from the barrel and ejected.  When the slide is fully to the rear, it is stopped by the fully compressed recoil spring.  The spring then pushes the slide forward, stripping a new cartridge from the magazine and pushing it into the chamber.  The firearm is then ready to fire the next round.

How limp wristing can cause a failure to cycle
Depending on the operating mechanism, there are a number of places that limp wristing can cause a failure to cycle.  Recoil operated firearms are more susceptible to failure of this type than blowback and gas-operated firearms, and lightweight polymer framed handguns are more susceptible than heavy, steel-framed or even lighter metal alloy handguns.
When there is not enough energy to move the slide back far enough relative to the frame to cycle the action, it is called limp wristing.
When there is too much energy in moving the slide back relative to the frame, it is called slide slam.

In blowback and gas-operated firearms, the slide reacts against the frame pushing the frame forward slightly against the recoil of the bullet leaving. In recoil operated firearms, the slide reacts against the bullet, and the frame is under no force at the time of firing.  As the slide begins to recoil to the rear some of that energy is transmitted to the frame through the locking mechanism (in locked breech designs) and the recoil spring.  This transmitted energy accelerates the frame to the rear as well.  If the frame is not sufficiently restrained by its mass and the shooter's grip or straightened wrist, the frame will "catch up" to the slide, and the recoil spring will not be fully compressed, and the slide will return forward under less than the designed force.

One common result of limp wristing is a failure to eject, as the slide will be moving too slowly at the point where the ejector is activated. The slow-moving case will be caught as the slide closes, resulting in a "stovepipe" jam. These jams can be easily dealt with by knocking the used brass out of the way with the side of the hand or closed fist. The other common result of limp wristing is a failure to return to battery: the slide will be moving too slowly to move the new cartridge fully into the chamber, so the slide will stop partially open. The least common form of failure is a failure to feed, where the slide returns to battery on an empty chamber, because the slide moved back just far enough to eject the fired cartridge, but not enough to strip the next round from the magazine.

How to address limp wristing
As the name suggests, the problem occurs most often with shooters who have a loose grip or allow their wrists to flex or bend too much relative to their forearm during recoil.  A firm, two handed grip or a stiffened wrist relative to the forearm will often solve the problem.  Some shooters, however, lack the strength for such a firm grip, and in that case there are three avenues that can be explored:  strengthen one's grip, changing the firearm, or changing the ammunition.

In the event that proper grip and follow through cannot be obtained because of physical limitations, an alternative would be to use a manually cycled firearm action, such as a revolver. Revolvers are a viable option for shooters who have difficulty with semiautomatic designs.  The other alternative is to pick a firearm whose frame is heavier in relation to its slide.  Polymer framed handguns have the lightest frames, and as the frame is flexible, it absorbs more energy than metal frames.  Aluminium and titanium alloys are slightly heavier and much stiffer than the polymers, and steel is the heaviest frame material generally used.  Full sized frames are also heavier than compact frames.  The heavier frames will have more inertia, and will rely less on the shooter's grip strength to hold the frame still.

The other approach is to alter the ammunition used.  Low-velocity, light bullet loads such as those used in target shooting have the least energy available to operate the action, and thus are the most sensitive to limp wristing.  A heavier or faster bullet will help.  Accurate Powder did tests of various powder types in Glock and SIG Sauer handguns, and determined that fast-burning powders caused failures to increase, and that medium- and slow-burning powders (of the range suitable for the cartridge) gave the best reliability.  Limp wristing would magnify these changes, so fast powders should be avoided.

When the ammo is too weak or the recoil spring is too stiff or the slide is too heavy, and limp wristing malfunctions occur, the cure may be more powerful ammo or a lower-force recoil spring. When the ammo is too powerful or the recoil spring is too weak or the slide is too light, slide slam occurs. Slide slam is bad for the firearm and bad for the shooter's hand. The correct balance is when the ejected casings land approximately 5 feet from the shooter. In this balance there is adequate ejection and no slide slam.

When a police force chooses guns and ammo for a diverse population of personnel with low hand mass all the way to high hand mass, the compromise will be to have the heavy-handed experience some slide slam, rather than the light-handed to experience limp wrist-induced malfunctions. The consequence is that those on the force with heavy hands will see ejected cases go further than 5 feet. This small amount of slide slam may cause some tiny additional wear to the slide, frame, and shooter's high mass hand, but it is a better option than a limp wristed malfunction for the low hand mass officers.

External links
 Accurate Arms 2003 reloading guide, see the 9 mm Luger section for note on fast powders in lightweight guns

Firearm terminology